Onna is a Local Government Area in Akwa Ibom State, Akwa Ibom State, Nigeria. Its name comes from an acronym of the names of the four predominant clans in the area: Oniong, Nnung Ndem, Awa Afaha and Awa.

Onna has a population of about 495,000 people worldwide. Onna is bounded by the east by Ibeno, west by mpat enin and eastern Obolo and south by the Atlantic ocean. Because of its proximity to the Atlantic Ocean, the people of Onna are predominantly fishermen and farmers. Onna is one of the host to exon Mobil Nigeria, oil exploration is ongoing in communities such as Ukpana, Akpabom, Ikot Abasi, Ikwe etc. Onna play host to the Utapette, Atabrikang and Ibioto oil fields The oil rich local government is also home to a number of highly intellectual population who have made numerous impact in the community, nationwide and in the diasporas.

Awa Iman in Onna is the hometown of His Excellency, governor Udom Emmanuel. Udom Emmanuel become the governor of Akwa Ibom State in 2015 after taking over from his predecessor, senator Godswill Akpabio on the platform of the people's democratic party, PDP.

Villages in Onna 
Ikwe
Ikot Akpatek
Ikot Ebidang
Ikot Ebekpo
Abat
Ndon Eyo
Mkpok
Okat
Ikot Edor
Ukpana
Mkpaeto
Ikot Esor
Ikot Eko Ibon
Okom
Ikot Ndudot
Ikot Ebiere
Ikot Udo
Ikot Nkan
Ikot Ndua Iman
Ikot Obong Ishiet
Ikot Akpan Ishiet
Atiamkpat
Awa Iman 
Nnung Oku
Ntan Ide Ekpe
Awa ndon
Awa aAtai
Ikot Abasi oniong
Ikot Mbong
Afaha Ikot Idem Udo
Afaha Ikot Akpan Mkpe
Afaha Atai
Afaha Ikot Nkan
Abak Ishiet
 Akata
 Ntukubo Akata
 Atabrikang
Ntafre
 Itak Abasi
 Iwod ukpom
 Ini- Ikwe
Ini- Edor

Monarch 
The traditional stool is occupied by Royal Fathers known as Paramount Rulers. The current Paramount Ruler is His Royal Majesty, Edidem Raymond Timothy Inyang (born June 13, 1947), who assumed the throne in 2017 upon the death of his predecessor His Eminence Edidem Akpabio Udo Ukpa. .

Oil and gas industry 
Onna is near large offshore oil- and gas-drilling operations. Both Exxon Mobil and Total S.A. have operations in the area. Their operations have caused some controversy. Local researchers found large amounts of pollution from oil spills in and around Onna.

References

Local Government Areas in Akwa Ibom State